Reedy Creek is a  long 3rd order tributary to the Dan River in Halifax County, Virginia.

Course 
Reedy Creek rises at Loves Shop, Virginia, and then flows generally southeast to join the Dan River at South Boston.

Watershed 
Reedy Creek drains  of area, receives about 45.6 in/year of precipitation, has a wetness index of 410.22, and is about 42% forested.

See also 
 List of Virginia Rivers

References

Watershed Maps 

Rivers of Virginia
Rivers of Halifax County, Virginia
Tributaries of the Roanoke River